Ramona Riley-Bozier is an American college volleyball coach who has served as the head coach at Morgan State since 1987.

Riley-Bozier graduated from the Morgan State University, earning her bachelor's degree in history in 1987. She completed her master's degree in sociology from Morgan State in 1991.

Head coaching record

Softball
The following table lists Riley-Bozier's head coaching record at the NCAA level.

Volleyball

References

External links 
 Morgan State Profile

Morgan State Bears
Sportspeople from Kansas City, Missouri
American volleyball coaches
African-American sports coaches
Morgan State University alumni
Morgan State Bears women's track and field athletes
Track and field athletes from Kansas City, Missouri
Sports coaches from Missouri
Sportspeople from Maryland
1963 births
Living people
20th-century African-American sportspeople
21st-century African-American people
20th-century African-American women
21st-century African-American women